Cantharidoscops is a genus of sea snails, marine gastropod mollusks in the family Trochidae, the top snails.

Species
Species within the genus Cantharidoscops include:
 Cantharidoscops clausus (Golikov & Gulbin, 1978)
 Cantharidoscops frigidus (Dall, 1919)

References

External links
 To World Register of Marine Species

 
Trochidae